QAP may refer to one of the following:

 QAP (Colombia), a Colombian newscast that aired between 1992 and 1997
 Quadratic assignment problem
 Quadratic assignment procedure, a method for evaluating the significance of regression coefficients in regression analysis
 Civic Party of Kazakhstan (Qazaqstan Azamattlyk Partiyasi)
 Queen Anne Press

See also 
 Ay Qap, formerly a Kazakh journal of opinion and debate
 Quality assurance program